Zheng Haixia (born March 7, 1967) is a Chinese retired professional women's basketball player for the China women's national basketball team and the Women's National Basketball Association.

International career
In 1983, Haixia made her debut at the Basketball World Championship and finished 3rd. The following year, she and her teammates finished 1st in the Asian Junior Basketball Championship and 3rd in the 23rd Olympic Games.

In 1986, she led the Chinese team to fifth in the 10th World Championship, 1st in the Asian Games, and 2nd in the World Championship.

In 1992, she inspired her teammates to win the silver in the Barcelona Olympics. The following year, she won the East Asian Games, the World University Games and National Games.

In 1994, she claimed the titles in the Asian Championship and ranked 2nd in the World Championship, being named MVP of the event by averaging 26.4 points, 13.1 rebounds and shooting 83.5% from the field.

One year later, she and her teammates retained their title in the 16th Asian Championship.

In 1996, she made her fourth Olympic appearance in Atlanta, Georgia, averaging 18.1 points, 9 rebounds. One year later, she won the 8th National Games with the PLA team.

WNBA career
In 1997 she retired from the Chinese national team and went to play with the Los Angeles Sparks in the WNBA in the United States. At the end of 1998, she returned to China and began to coach the PLA women's team.  She is currently a coach in China.

In 1997 Haixia received the Kim Perrot Sportsmanship Award becoming the first Asian woman as well as international player to win any award in the WNBA.  She led the WNBA in field goal percentage at .618.

Career statistics

|-
| style="text-align:left;"|1997
| style="text-align:left;"|Los Angeles
| 28 || 21 || 19.9 || .618 || — || .661 || 4.4 || 0.6 || 0.4 || 0.7 || 1.6 || 9.3
|-
| style="text-align:left;"|1998
| style="text-align:left;"|Los Angeles
| 6 || 2 || 16.3 || .625 || — || .714 || 4.3 || 0.5 || 0.0 || 0.2 || 1.0 || 7.5
|-
| style="text-align:left;"|Career
| style="text-align:left;"|2 years, 1 team
| 34 || 23 || 19.3 || .619 || — || .667 || 4.4 || 0.6 || 0.3 || 0.6 || 1.5 || 8.9

Personal life
She started to practice basketball at the age of 12 and was selected by the Wuhan Army club team one year later. In 1983, she entered the national team. She married Xu Qinghua in Beijing on June 19, 2010.

References

External links
 Haixia Zheng in WNBA history
 2001 archived WNBA bio

1967 births
Living people
Asian Games bronze medalists for China
Asian Games gold medalists for China
Asian Games medalists in basketball
Asian Games silver medalists for China
Basketball players at the 1984 Summer Olympics
Basketball players at the 1986 Asian Games
Basketball players at the 1988 Summer Olympics
Basketball players at the 1990 Asian Games
Basketball players at the 1992 Summer Olympics
Basketball players at the 1994 Asian Games
Basketball players at the 1996 Summer Olympics
Basketball players from Henan
Centers (basketball)
Chinese expatriate basketball people in the United States
Chinese women's basketball players
FIBA Hall of Fame inductees
Los Angeles Sparks draft picks
Los Angeles Sparks players
Medalists at the 1984 Summer Olympics
Medalists at the 1986 Asian Games
Medalists at the 1990 Asian Games
Medalists at the 1992 Summer Olympics
Medalists at the 1994 Asian Games
Olympic basketball players of China
Olympic bronze medalists for China
Olympic medalists in basketball
Olympic silver medalists for China
People from Shangqiu